The Harris-Banks House, also known as White Arches, is a historic mansion in Columbus, Mississippi, U.S.. It was built from 1857 to 1861 for Jeptha Vining Harris, a cotton planter. It stayed in the Harris family until 1967. It has been listed on the National Register of Historic Places since November 16, 1978.

References

Houses on the National Register of Historic Places in Mississippi
Italianate architecture in Mississippi
Houses completed in 1861
National Register of Historic Places in Lowndes County, Mississippi
1861 establishments in Mississippi